Franklin was one of 16 s built for the French Navy during the 1910s.

Citations

Bibliography

Brumaire-class submarines
World War I submarines of France
1913 ships